Ripper 2 (US title: Ripper 2: Letter from Within) is a 2004 British horror film directed by Jonas Quastel, starring Erin Karpluk and Nicolas Irons, and is a sequel to Ripper. It was written and produced by John A. Curtis and Pat Bermel.

Plot 
The director of an asylum offers to the serial killer Molly Keller a chance to be submitted to a pilot unconventional experiment in Prague, in the Weisser Institute. Molly accepts, and she travels to the clinic, where Dr. Samuel Wiesser developed a treatment using a virtual world, and Molly and deranged youngsters would be trial subjects. However, something does not work well in the experiment, and when the patients die in their trip, the same happens in the real world.

Cast 
 Erin Karpluk as  Molly Keller
 Nicholas Irons as Erich Goethe
 Mhairi Steenbock as Juliette Dureau
 Jane Peachey as Lara Svetlana
 Daniel Coonan as Grant Jessup
 Colin Lawrence as Roberto Edwards
 Myfanwy Waring as Sally Trigg
 Andrea Miltner as Marya
 Curtis Matthew as Psychologist
 Richard Bremmer as Dr. Samuel Wiesser

Reception
Horror site Vegan Voorhees said, "Even with two directors and four scribes, the creative team fail to even muster the most basic of chills."

References

External links 
 
 

2004 films
British horror films
2004 horror films
Direct-to-video sequel films
Films about Jack the Ripper
2000s English-language films
2000s British films